Rukometni Klub Podravka Koprivnica is a Croatian women's handball club from Koprivnica. It is the most successful club in Croatian women's handball since formation of the league in 1992. The team currently competes in the Croatia women's first handball league. They have a fan club called Red Roosters formed in 2002.

History
The club was established in 1955 under the name Ivo Marinković and played its first friendly match in December against Grafičar Bjelovar.  First official game was played in April 1956 against Slavija Čakovec. In 1956 team was renamed to RK Partizan.  In seasons 1960/1961 and 1962/1963 Partizan became amateur champion of SR Croatia.  In 1964 club changed the name to RK Podravka since it was sponsored by the factory who had the same name.  The club also qualified in the first league the same year. In 1966 RK Podravka won its first national title and kept it for two years in a row. In 1972 the team was degraded in the second league but they managed to return in the first league in 1975.  However, they returned in the second league in 1976 and remained there until 1980 and then again fell in the second league in 1982.  In 1990 they again entered the first league and remained there until its dissolution in 1991 when Croatia gained independence.  Since 1993 they were not Croatian champions only in the seasons 2003/2004, 2013/2014 and 2021/2022, however their biggest success was in 1996 when the team won Women's EHF Champions League.

Kits

Honours
 Championship of Yugoslavia
Winners (2): 1966, 1967

 Championship of Croatia
Winners (26): 1993, 1994, 1995, 1996, 1997, 1998, 1999, 2000, 2001, 2002, 2003, 2005, 2006, 2007, 2008, 2009, 2010, 2011, 2012, 2013, 2015, 2016, 2017, 2018, 2019, 2021

 Croatian Cup
Winners (24): 1993, 1994, 1995, 1996, 1997, 1998, 1999, 2000, 2001, 2002, 2003, 2004, 2006, 2008, 2009, 2010, 2011,2012, 2013, 2015, 2016, 2017, 2019, 2022

 Women's EHF Champions League
Winners (1): 1996

 EHF Women's Champions Trophy
Winners (1): 1996

European record

Team

Current squad
Squad for the 2022–23 season

Goalkeepers
 1  Antonia Tucaković
 30  Nika Galinec
 98  Lucija Bešen
Wingers
LW
   Katja Vuković
 50  Andrea Šimara
RW
 3  Ana Turk
 2  Nikolina Zadravec 
Line players
 6  Elena Popović
 18  Sara Šenvald
 27  Iryna Stelmakh

Back players
LB
 7  Ema Guskic
 11  Tena Megerle
 44  Tina Barišić
CB
 4  Larissa Kalaus
 64  Ana Pandza
RB
 14  Lea Franušić
 15  Dora Kalaus
 25  Hannah Vuljak

Transfers
Transfers for the 2023–24 season

 Joining

 Leaving

Technical staff
 Head coach:  Goran Mrđen
 Assistant coach:  Antonio Pranjić
 Goalkeeper coach:  Goran Trajkoski
 Physiotherapist:  Bojan Savić i Asja Cestar
 Fitness coach:  Nikola Golub

Notable players

  Snježana Petika 
  Dora Krsnik
  Vlatka Mihoci 
  Irina Maljko 
  Samira Hasagić 
  Željana Štević 
  Andreja Hrg 
  Renata Pavlačić 
  Svitlana Pasičnik 
  Miranda Tatari 
  Andrea Penezić
  Anita Gaće
  Božica Gregurić 
  Dijana Ivandija 
  Ljerka Krajnović 
  Maja Zebić
  Sanela Knezović
  Nikica Pušić-Koroljević
  Dijana Jovetić
  Andrea Čović
  Žana Čović
  Kristina Jambrović 
  Tatjana Jukić 
  Maja Kožnjak
  Dina Havić
  Ivana Kapitanović
  Barbara Stančin 
  Aneta Benko
  Vesna Milanović-Litre
  Ana Debelić
  Dragica Džono
  Ekatarina Nemaškalo
  Dora Kalaus
  Ivana Jelčić
  Dejana Milosavljević
  Ivana Dežić
  Marijeta Vidak
  Valentina Cozma
  Mariana Tîrcă
  Ionela Stanca
  Paula Ungureanu
  Iulia Dumanska
  Sanja Damnjanović
  Jovana Risović
  Jelena Lavko
  Jelena Trifunović
  Tjaša Stanko
  Sergeja Stefanišin
  Ágnes Farkas
  Helga Németh
  Anita Bulath
  Ana Đokić
  Sandra Nikčević
  Marta Batinović
  Mirjana Milenković
  Dijana Mugoša
  Andrijana Budimir
  Natalia Todorovska
  Elena Gjeorgjievska
  Marina Naukovich
  Lamprini Tsàkalou
  Azenaide Carlos

Notable former coaches 
  Josip Samaržija-Bepo 
  Josip Šojat (1994–1996; 2004–2007)
  Zdravko Zovko (2007–2010)
  Vinko Kandija 
  Senad Jagodic
  Goran Mrđen (2003–2004; 2013–2017; 2021–2022)
  Snježana Petika (2017–2018)
  Zlatko Saračević (2018–2021)
  Antonio Pranjić (interim) (Feb 2021–Jun 2021; Oct 2021)
  Neven Hrupec (2021)
  Željko Babić (2022–)

References

External links
 
 

Croatian handball clubs
Handball clubs established in 1955
Sport in Koprivnica
Women's sports teams in Croatia
Women's handball clubs
Women's handball in Croatia
1955 establishments in Croatia